The PLDT Home Fibr Hitters (formerly, PLDT Volleyball Club) is a professional men's volleyball team owned by PLDT. It was established in 2013 and originally consisted of men's and women's teams. In 2018, the women's team became merged with the Smart Giga Hitters (later renamed PLDT Home Fibr Hitters women's team). The men's team has been playing in the Spikers' Turf since October 2018.

History
The club debuted in 2013 as the PLDT myDSL Speed Boosters women's team in the Philippine Superliga (PSL) during the 2013 Invitational Conference. The men's team debuted in the following conference.

In 2014, while participating in the PSL, the club joined in the Shakey's V-League with its women's team as the PLDT Home Telpad Turbo Boosters during the 2014 Open Conference.

The club ended its participation in the PSL after the 2014 season. In 2015, the club competed under the name PLDT Home Ultera Ultra Fast Hitters and the men's team joined the 2015 Open Conference of the Spikers' Turf, becoming its first champion.

The club became dormant in 2016 and 2017. It returned to active competition in 2018 in the Premier Volleyball League (formerly, Shakey's V-League and Spikers’ Turf) as the PayMaya High Flyers (women's) and the PLDT Home Fibr Ultra Fast Hitters (men's).

In September 2018, the women's team was merged with the Smart Prepaid Giga Hitters, its affiliate team in the PSL. The Smart team was renamed the PLDT Home Fibr Power Hitters in February 2019.

Name changes

Women’s roster

Philippine SuperLiga 
For the 2018 PSL All-Filipino Conference see Smart Prepaid Giga Hitters.

Shakey's V-League 

Coaching staff
 Head coach:Roger Gorayeb

Premier Volleyball League 

Coaching staff
 Head coach:Roger Gorayeb
 Assistant coaches:Clint Malazo

Team Staff
 Team Manager:Jamil Fabia
 Trainer:Neil Fred Are

Medical Staff
 Team Physician:
 Physical Therapist:Raymond Pili

Honors

Team 
Philippine SuperLiga:

Premier Volleyball League:

Others:

Individual 
Premier Volleyball League:

Philippine SuperLiga:

Team captains
  Lou Ann Latigay (2013)
  Suzanne Roces (2014 - 2015)
  Jasmine Nabor (2018)

Head coach
 Roger Gorayeb

Men’s roster

Current line-up 

Coaching staff
 Head coach: Arthur Alan "Odjie" Mámon
 Assistant coach: Rolando Casillan

Previous line-up 

Coaching staff
 Head coach: Arthur Alan "Odjie" Mámon
 Assistant coach: Rolando Casillan

Coaching staff
 Head coach: Arthur Allan "Odjie" Mámon
 Assistant coach: Jan Paul Doloiras

Honors

Team
Spikers' Turf/Premier Volleyball League:

Philippine SuperLiga:

Others:

Individual
Spikers' Turf/Premier Volleyball League:

Philippine Superliga: 

Notes:

Team captains
  Richard Gomez (2013)
  Dante Alinsunirin (2014)
  Ronaldo Casillan (2015)
  John Vic de Guzman (2018 Reinforced)
  Henry James Pecaña (2018 Open)

Head coach
 Arthur Allan “Odgie” Mamon

See also
 PLDT Home Fibr Hitters (women's team)
 PLDT Home TVolution (2014 Asian Men's Club Volleyball Championship team)
 Cignal HD Spikers (women's team)
 Cignal HD Spikers (men's team)

References

Premier Volleyball League (Philippines)
Shakey's V-League
Philippine Super Liga
2013 establishments in the Philippines
Volleyball clubs established in 2013
Men's volleyball teams in the Philippines
Women's volleyball teams in the Philippines